Ian Scott (born 7 March 1940) is a former Australian rules footballer who played with Geelong in the VFL during the 1960s.

Scott played in the back pocket for Geelong and was a premiership player in his first season at the club.  Three of his first four games, including the 1963 VFL Grand Final, were played against Hawthorn.

In late 1965 Scott injured his right knee and missed the last six games of the season. He re-injured the knee in March 1966 and did not play for Geelong again.

References

External links

1940 births
Australian rules footballers from Victoria (Australia)
Geelong Football Club players
Geelong Football Club Premiership players
Terang Football Club players
Living people
One-time VFL/AFL Premiership players